Chlorophacinone is an anticoagulant used as a rodenticide.  It is classified as an extremely hazardous substance in the United States as defined in Section 302 of the U.S. Emergency Planning and Community Right-to-Know Act (42 U.S.C. 11002) and is subject to strict reporting requirements by facilities which produce, store, or use it in significant quantities.

See also
 1,3-Indandione

References

Pesticides
Indandiones
Chloroarenes
Anticoagulant rodenticides